The 2021 IIHF World Championship Division III was scheduled to be an international ice hockey tournament run by the International Ice Hockey Federation.

The Group A tournament would have been held in Kockelscheuer, Luxembourg from 18 to 24 April and the Group B tournament in Cape Town, South Africa from 19 to 25 April 2021.

On 18 November 2020, both tournaments were cancelled due to the COVID-19 pandemic.

Group A tournament

Participants

Standings

Group B tournament

Participants

Standings

References

2020
Division III
2021 IIHF World Championship Division III
2021 IIHF World Championship Division III
Sports competitions in Cape Town
2021 in South African sport
April 2021 sports events in Europe
April 2021 sports events in South Africa
Ice hockey events cancelled due to the COVID-19 pandemic